Luis Muñoz Rivera School (Spanish: Escuela Luis Muñoz Rivera) is a historic 1926 public school located in Lajas, Puerto Rico. It was added to the United States National Register of Historic Places in 2012.

The school, located at 65 de Infantería Street, corner with Dávila Street, in the downtown area of the municipality of Lajas, is a one-story high, reinforced concrete building. Erected four blocks away from the town's plaza in a rectangular lot measuring 18,425 square meters, the school originally included 8 classrooms. Many original features remain in place, making the Luis Muñoz Rivera School in Lajas one of Puerto Rico's best examples of government-sponsored institutional architecture during the early 20th century.

See also 
 Oliver Hazard Perry Graded School: also in Lajas, Puerto Rico
 National Register of Historic Places listings in western Puerto Rico

References 

School buildings on the National Register of Historic Places in Puerto Rico
1926 establishments in Puerto Rico
Beaux-Arts architecture in Puerto Rico
School buildings completed in 1926
Lajas, Puerto Rico